Theodore Soderberg (January 31, 1890 – December 19, 1971) was an American sound engineer. He was nominated for an Academy Awards in the category Sound Recording.

Selected filmography
 Imitation of Life (1934)

References

External links

1890 births
1971 deaths
American audio engineers
20th-century American engineers